The United Kingdom of Great Britain and Northern Ireland competed as Great Britain at the 1932 Winter Olympics in Lake Placid, United States. This was the first time in Olympic History that Great Britain had not won a medal of any colour.

The Great Britain team included 11-year-old figure skater Cecilia Colledge - the youngest ever British athlete to appear in the Olympic Games (Winter or Summer).

Figure skating

Women

References

 Olympic Winter Games 1932, full results by sports-reference.com

Nations at the 1932 Winter Olympics
1932
Olympics, Winter
Winter sports in the United Kingdom